Bahçelik Dam is an embankment dam on the Zamanti River in Kayseri Province, Turkey, built between 1996 and 2002.

See also

List of dams and reservoirs in Turkey

External links
DSI

Dams in Kayseri Province
Hydroelectric power stations in Turkey
Dams completed in 2002
2002 establishments in Turkey